Transformers: Energon, known in Japan as , is an anime series which debuted on January 9, 2004. It is a direct sequel to Transformers: Armada. It is also the first Japanese Transformers show where the Transformers are computer-generated (CG), in a cel-shaded technique similar to the Zoids anime, which was a trend that would continue into the next series, Transformers: Cybertron. 
In the United States, KidsClick started airing reruns of the show from August 27, 2018 until November 3, 2018. Along with Transformers: Armada and Transformers: Cybertron, Transformers: Energon  is a part of a saga in the Transformers series known as the "Unicron Trilogy"
In this series, the Transformers' primary gimmicks are the Autobots' ability to combine with partners of the same size, the Decepticons' ability to use powered up forms, and the addition of Energon weapons and stars that can be placed on any Transformer. Mini-Cons, from the previous line, are still present, but all Mini-Con pegs are "dummy" pegs as they do not activate a function on the toy.

Plot

Ten years after the war for the Mini-Cons and the apparent destruction of Unicron, the mysterious Alpha Q (which stands for "Quintesson"), operating out of the husk of the planet-eater's body, releases energy-eating Terrorcons to attack the Autobots' Cybertron Cities in the Solar system, gathering Energon for Alpha Q's plan. As the Autobots mobilize against the new threat alongside their human allies (including the teenager Kicker), Alpha Q creates Scorponok to lead the Terrorcons and forges a sword from the Spark of the Decepticon leader Megatron (whose corpse lies within Unicron), later known as Galvatron, in order to turn the other Decepticons on Earth to his side. Megatron engineers his own resurrection, however, taking control of Unicron's body and forcing Alpha Q to flee inside Unicron's head, then attacking Ocean City on Earth. Alpha Q recreates Starscream to assassinate Optimus Prime, but Starscream is brainwashed into Megatron's service, all along Scorponok continues to act as Alpha Q's mole within the Decepticons. Meanwhile, as the Autobots begin construction of Energon Towers to protect the Earth, the legendary figure from Cybertron history known as Rodimus makes his reappearance.

With the activation of Earth's new Energon Grid, shielding it from attack by the Decepticons, the Autobots turn their attention to Unicron. Leaving Earth in the ship, the Miranda II, they locate Unicron's body. Megatron mobilizes the chaos-bringer, and pursues the Autobots through their space bridge, emerging in the vicinity of Cybertron. The Transformers' homeworld riddled with Energon towers, fired, leaving Unicron badly damaged. The Autobots form an alliance with Alpha Q, who is already working with Rodimus and his crew, and learn his origin and his motives for stealing Energon: he seeks to use it to recreate that which Unicron has destroyed. Meanwhile, Megatron's forces attack Cybertron, and the Decepticon criminal Shockblast is inducted into their ranks. In the course of Shockblast's escape from prison, guard Wing Dagger swears revenge for the death of his partner, Padlock, and when an Energon tower collapses on him and Tidal Wave, Megatron reconstructs his minion as Mirage, while Primus recreates Wing Dagger as the mighty Wing Saber, who joins the battle alongside Optimus Prime within Unicron. As the battle rages, Kicker arranges to channel all of Earth's Energon into Unicron's head, which Alpha Q then rams into Unicron's body. The resultant reaction with the negatively charged Energon within the body causes a fissure in reality, through which all the combatants are sucked.

In the new region of space on the other side of the fissure, Alpha Q has successfully recreated all the worlds destroyed by Unicron, sustaining them from within Unicron's head, which has now become an Energon sun. The Autobots set about establishing Energon Towers on the new planets to protect them, while Megatron sees the new worlds as a source of more Energon to reactivate Unicron. Having brainwashed Scorponok to become fully loyal to him, Megatron attempts to do the same to Inferno, but he fights the process. A rescue team consisting of Cliffjumper, Downshift, and Bulkhead is dispatched from Cybertron and Earth and teams up with the Autobots to protect the new worlds, but Inferno is then destroyed when he falls into the Energon sun, defeating the Decepticon influence of Megatron. Thankfully, his Spark is saved and he is reborn as Roadblock, just as the ancient Autobot, Omega Supreme, is awakened on Cybertron and joins the Autobots. Megatron succeeds in animating Unicron, who reclaims his head, killing Alpha Q in the process, but then Shockblast attempts to seize control of Unicron, only to have his own mind taken over by the "demi-god", ultimately destroying him. Megatron then resumes control, but falls prey to Unicron's influence as well, as the two minds battle for control as they struggle with Optimus Supreme, the combined form of Optimus Prime and Omega Supreme. Optimus Supreme is enlarged to giant size with a power boost from Primus which also energises several of the other Autobots. In a veritable battle of the titans, Optimus Supreme destroys Unicron, but his mind lives on within Megatron.

Although many of the Decepticons are captured and imprisoned on Cybertron, Megatron and his remaining forces soon attack the planet and free them. Another fugitive is Shockblast's younger brother, Sixshot, who joins Megatron's team to get revenge on Optimus Prime for his brother's death. Guided by Unicron's consciousness, Megatron is led to a subterranean reservoir of Super Energon, which transforms him into Galvatron. Two of the Super Energon's guardians, Bruticus Maximus and Constructicon Maximus, awake from stasis and side with him, but the third, Superion Maximus, sides with the Autobots. In the ensuing battle, the rupture of several Energon Towers sees a blanket of damaging Energon gas coat Cybertron's surface, keeping the Autobots trapped off the planet, forcing them to send in Kicker and the Omnicons to stop the gas flow while Galvatron seizes control of the planet and directs its movement back to Alpha Q's region of space. In a multi-pronged attack, the Autobots turn the tables, but Galvatron then immerses himself in the Super Energon again, growing to a colossal size, as Unicron's mind once again takes over his own and directs him into space to merge with his Spark, still intact in the void. Optimus Prime grows to gigantic size also and forces Galvatron into a battle, bringing his consciousness back to the surface, at which point Prime drains Unicron's essence from his body. Galvatron then seeks to destroy Unicron's spark, but is possessed by it, while all of the Autobots combine their Sparks of Combination with Optimus Prime, reviving him and leading into the final battle with Unicron, which is promptly aborted when Galvatron takes control of his body again and plunges himself into the foundling sun created by Primus from the Super Energon, preferring to die than to be manipulated. With this action, the sun ignites, breathing new life into Alpha Q's worlds, lighting the way to a brighter tomorrow.

 Cast 
 English cast (Energon) Arranged alphabetically by last name. Alistair Abell - Prowl
 Mark Acheson - Unicron
 Sharon Alexander - Arcee
 Doron Bell - Cliffjumper
 Don Brown - Cyclonus/Snow Cat, Constructicon Maximus/Steamhammer
 Garry Chalk - Optimus Prime
 Michael Daingerfield - Inferno/Roadblock
 Trevor Devall - Alpha Q, Bruticus Maximus/Barricade
 Michael Dobson - Signal Flare, Starscream
 Paul Dobson - Rodimus, Superion Maximus/Storm Jet
 Brian Drummond - Shockblast
 Tabitha St. Germain - Alexis
 Ron Halder - Primus, Brian Jones, Padlock
 Matt Hill - Carlos, Ironhide
 David Kaye - Megatron/Galvatron
 Ellen Kennedy - Misha Miramond
 Terry Klassen - Skyblast, Six Shot
 Scott McNeil - Jetfire, Omega Supreme, Strongarm
 Brent Miller - Hot Shot
 Kirby Morrow - Bradley "Rad" White
 Colin Murdock - Scorponok, Wing Saber
 Nicole Oliver - Miranda Jones, Sally Jones
 Ty Olsson - Downshift
 Doug Parker - Tidal Wave/Mirage
 Ward Perry - Landmine
 Alvin Sanders - Demolishor
 Tony Sampson - Rhyming Omnicon fanboys
 Brad Swaile - Kicker Jones
 French Tickner - Bulkhead

 Japanese cast (Superlink) 
The cast of Superlink was:
 Akira Tomisaka - Alexa
 Isshin Chiba - SandStorm/SnowStorm, BlastArm, Superion
 Jin Yamanoi - ShockWave/ShockFleet, Dr. Jones, AirGlide
 Junichi Endo - Galvatron, Carlos
 Katsuyuki Konishi - Optimus Prime, OverDrive
 Kenta Miyake - LandMine, Omega Supreme
 Koji Yusa - Ironhide/Irontread, Wing Dagger/Wing Saber
 Kosuke Toriumi - Hot Shot
 Makoto Yasumura - Red Alert, WheelJack, Bruticus
 Masataka Nakai - Rad
 Masumi Asano - Sally, Miranda, Ariel
 Mitsuo Iwata - Roadbuster
 Nobuo Tobita - Nightscream, Sprung, Signal Flare, Buildron, Padlock
 Nobutoshi Kanna - Inferno, Laserwave, Sixshot
 Nobuyuki Hiyama - Skyfire
 Ryotaro Okiayu - Rodimus Convoy
 Tesshō Genda - Primus
 Yasunori Masutani - MegaZarak
 Yukiko Tagami - Misha
 Yūichi Nagashima - AlphaQ, DinoBot
 Yukie Maeda - AlphaQ (true)

Comics
Such as with the previous line of Transformers: Armada, the Energon toyline came with its own mini-comic/toy catalogue with a brief five-page story told in multiple languages one after the other; most of them formed parts of an arc, whilst others featured back and forth victories between the Autobots and Decepticons, whilst showcasing the new additions to the line such as the Terrorcons and Omnicons.Energons mainstream comic distribution came courtesy of the former comics giant Dreamwave, taking over their Armada comic title with Issue 18, and written by Simon Furman. But whilst the Armada title had faithfully approached the concepts of the animated series, this title took liberties with the characters and told a far more expansive arc, even incorporating completely new players, such as a member of the High Council type Autobot named Avalon secretly collaborating with Alpha Q, who, like his animated counterpart, had a separate agenda, but it may never be known if he had the same goals as the anime version.

The initial story arc also continued plotlines from the final Armada issue, as it retained Optimus Prime's Armada form (in its upgraded grey and blue Powerlinx form) for the earliest portions as Cybertron came under attack from the still thriving, but damaged, Unicron. Several Autobots and a Decepticon Unicron had captured in the final Armada issue became his "Four Horsemen", a nod to one of the past Botcon Hasbro panels in which Aaron Archer called these four Unicron's Four Horsemen. The Four Horsemen are Rhinox (War), Terrorsaur (Famine), Airazor (Death), and Cheetor (Pestilence). As the Horsemen ravaged Cybertron, Prime interacted with Vector Sigma and was upgraded to his traditional Energon form.

Rad, Carlos, and Alexis were given more character development the Energon comic as opposed to the supporting bit parts/semi-cameos they had in the television series, Alexis was now an anti-war demonstrator, in no government position, and was largely responsible for the Autobots being able to retrieve Kicker from a Decepticon ambush. Rad and Alexis would get more time, sans Carlos, as the storylines progressed, with both showing a deeper affection for the other, however the relationship was never fully explored due to the closure of Dreamwave.

The Transformers presence on Earth was also handled with more resentment and hostility from a handful of citizens; this culminated in a large-scale Terrorcon assault on Earth during the second story arc, as Megatron transported Optimus into the hub of Unicron, where his spark had been trapped since the conclusion of the Armada comic, and manipulated Prime into freeing him so he could enter a body he had been secretly preparing. Upon release, Megatron swiftly took control of the Decepticons again, killing their leader Scorponok. Optimus remained inside Unicron, fighting off the horrors within heading for a final showdown with the heart of the enemy.

Unfortunately, like many of the plotlines above, the comic folded, with all of the ongoing storylines abandoned, although it was confirmed in the final issue that the intended last arc for the Energon comic would have led directly into DW's own version of events in Transformers: Cybertron.

IDW, the current holders of the franchise, have not continued publication of the Energon comic or even published a Cybertron comic, they did however release a collection of the Hasbro Transformers Collectors' Club exclusive storyline, Transformers: Cybertron - Balancing Act, which followed Vector Prime, on a side quest to the central Cybertron animated series storyline.

Toys
A small number of Transformers: Energon Built to Rule sets had a limited, test market release, and the structure of the Trans-Skeleton was changed for the Energon'' characters, to a much more solid skeleton with larger, blockier limbs. This led to much more solid, stable and sturdy-looking robot modes, but the entire line performed poorly, so it was dropped in its entirety in 2004.

References

External links

 Takara page
 
 

2004 anime television series debuts
2004 Japanese television series endings
Japanese children's animated action television series
Japanese children's animated space adventure television series
Japanese children's animated science fantasy television series
Japanese children's animated superhero television series
Actas
Adventure anime and manga
Computer-animated television series
Mecha anime and manga
Japanese television series based on American television series
Television shows set in the United States
Television series set in the 2020s
Toonami
Energon
Energon
TV Tokyo original programming